Mallu Chhitt is a village in Syedanwali union council of Sialkot District in the Punjab province of Pakistan. It is the largest village of the union council.

Villages in Sialkot District